Dave or David Mat(t)hews may refer to:

Music
 Dave Matthews (born 1967), lead singer and guitarist of the pop music group Dave Matthews Band
 Dave Matthews (saxophonist) (1911–1997), American jazz saxophonist
 David Matthews (keyboardist) (born 1942), U.S. jazz composer, arranger, and keyboardist
 David Matthews (composer) (born 1943), English composer

Politics
 David Mathews (c. 1739–1800), mayor of New York City
 David Matthews (British politician) (1868–1960), MP for Swansea East
 F. David Mathews (born 1935), academic and politician

Sports
 David Matthews (rugby union) (1937–2019), rugby union flanker
 David Matthews (runner) (born 1974), Irish athlete
 David Mathews (field hockey) (born 1977), English field hockey player
 David Matthews (footballer) (born 1965), English footballer

Other
 David Matthews (author) (born 1967), American author
 David Matthews (blackjack player), American blackjack player and writer
 David Matthews (academic) (1932–2020), American and British scholar, author, and translator
 David A. Matthews (1847–1923), American soldier and Medal of Honor recipient
 Dave Matthews (Family Affairs), fictional character in the British TV soap opera Family Affairs

See also
David Mathew (disambiguation)